

Charles Wenman (born 1797) was an English cricketer who played in one first-class match in 1828.

Wenman was born at Benenden in Kent in 1797, the son of John Wenman and his first wife Ann. His mother died the same year, and his father remarried; Wenman's half-brother Ned was born in 1808. The family was closely linked to Benenden Cricket Club, an important side in Kent at the time and one that became one of the strongest in England by the 1830s, with Wenman's father playing for the side as did a number of his extended family members. Although Wenman has been assumed to have played for the side, there are no definitive references to him having done so.

Although no other records of his cricket career survive, Wenman is known to have made a single first-class appearance, in an 1828 match played by a Kent XI at Brighton against a Sussex team. The match was organised by the Hawkhurst club and Wenman appeared alongside his half-brother Ned and his cousin George. He scored three runs in the only innings in which it is known that he batted, although it is possible that the scorecard is incomplete.

Wenman was working as a carpenter in Brixton at the 1841 census and was married. No records of his life after this point have been found.

Notes

References

Bibliography
 Carlaw D (2020) Kent County Cricketers A to Z. Part One: 1806–1914 (revised edition), pp. 563. (Available online at the Association of Cricket Statisticians and Historians. Retrieved 2020-12-21.)
Milton H (1992) Cricket Grounds of Kent. Nottingham: The Association of Cricket Statisticians and Historians. (Available online. Retrieved 2022-04-04.)

External links

1797 births
English cricketers
Kent cricketers
Year of death missing
People from Benenden